Leonel Noriega  (born 10 May 1975 in Cobán), nicknamed "El Cholo", is a Guatemalan football midfielder who currently plays for Deportivo Marquense in the Liga Nacional de Guatemala.

Club career
Noriega, a defensive midfielder, has been playing for Marquense since 2006 after moving from CD Suchitepéquez and signed a year extension of his contract ahead of the 2009/2010 season.

International career
Noriega made his debut for Guatemala in a February 2006 friendly match against the United States and has made 13 appearances for the full Guatemala national football team including three matches at the 2007 CONCACAF Gold Cup He has also represented his country at the UNCAF Nations Cup 2007.

References

External links
 

1975 births
Living people
People from Cobán
Guatemalan footballers
Guatemala international footballers
2007 UNCAF Nations Cup players
2007 CONCACAF Gold Cup players
C.D. Suchitepéquez players
Deportivo Marquense players
Association football midfielders